Goldsborough may refer to:

Places

Australia 
 Goldsborough, Queensland, a locality in the Cairns Region
 Goldsbrough Mort Woolstore, a heritage-listed building in Brisbane, Queensland
 Goldsbrough Mort Building, Rockhampton, a heritage-listed building in Queensland

United Kingdom 
Goldsborough, Harrogate, North Yorkshire
Goldsborough Hall
Goldsborough railway station, a closed station
Goldsborough, Scarborough, North Yorkshire

Other uses
USS Goldsborough, a list of ships with the name
Battle of Goldsborough Bridge, American Civil War
Goldsborough (novel), a 1953 novel by Stefan Heym, and the fictional town in the novel

People with the surname
Brice Goldsborough, aviator and father of Frank Goldsborough
Charles Goldsborough, Governor of Maryland
Frank Goldsborough, aviator and son of Brice Herbert Goldsborough
James O. Goldsborough, American journalist
Sir John Goldsborough (died 1693), sea captain
John Goldesburg (1568–1618), legal reporter
John R. Goldsborough (1809-1877), American Civil War United States Navy officer and later commodore
Louis M. Goldsborough (1805-1877), American Civil War rear admiral
Phillips Lee Goldsborough, U.S. senator and Maryland governor
Robert Goldsborough, lawyer and statesman
Robert Goldsborough (writer), author
Robert Henry Goldsborough, Federalist
Thomas Alan Goldsborough, jurist and politician

See also
 Goldsboro (disambiguation)
 Richard Goldsbrough, Australian businessman